The 1983 Country Music Association Awards, 17th Ceremony, was held on October 10, 1983, at the Grand Ole Opry House, Nashville, Tennessee, and was hosted by CMA Award winner Willie Nelson and artist Anne Murray.

Winners and nominees 
Winners in Bold.

Hall of Fame

References 

Country Music Association
CMA
Country Music Association Awards
Country Music Association Awards
Country Music Association Awards
Country Music Association Awards
20th century in Nashville, Tennessee
Events in Nashville, Tennessee